Saluda Main Street Historic District is a national historic district located at Saluda, Polk County, North Carolina. The district encompasses 16 contributing buildings, 1 contributing site, and 1 contributing structure in the central business district of Saluda.  It includes buildings dated from about 1878 to 1946 and notable examples of Late Gothic Revival and Stick style / Eastlake movement architecture. Notable buildings include the Saluda Presbyterian Church (1895-1896), former Saluda Depot (c. 1900-1910), the Saluda City Hall (1896-1907), the M. A. Pace Store (1905-1910), Thompson's Store (1905-1910), Pebbledash Building (1911-1916), Top Service Station (1930s), and the former United States Post Office (c. 1910).

It was listed on the National Register of Historic Places in 1996.

Gallery

References

Historic districts on the National Register of Historic Places in North Carolina
Gothic Revival architecture in North Carolina
Victorian architecture in North Carolina
Buildings and structures in Polk County, North Carolina
National Register of Historic Places in Polk County, North Carolina